PMDF can refer to:

People
Tha Grimm Teachaz, PMDF (Prince Midnight Dark Force)

Software
PMDF, a Pascal version of MMDF, written for VAX/VMS, later marketed by Innosoft.